Dichostates concretus is a species of beetle in the family Cerambycidae. It was described by Pascoe in 1857. It is known from Tanzania, the Democratic Republic of the Congo, and South Africa.

References

Crossotini
Beetles described in 1857